Lisa Marcos is a Canadian actress and former model.

Career
She began her career as a model at the age of 14 years but after eight years, decided to pursue her passion for acting and approached a talent agency. Soon after her acting career began in 2002 with a guest role on Soul Food. She is best known as Charlie Marks in the television series The Listener.

Filmography

Film

Television

References

External links
 

Canadian television actresses
Living people
Canadian people of Portuguese descent
Year of birth missing (living people)